A mehrab or mihrab is a semicircular niche in the wall of a mosque that indicates the direction of the Kaaba in Mecca and, hence, the direction that Muslims should face when praying.

Mehrab may also refer to:

People
 Mehrab of Shirvan, 16th century Shah of Shirvan
 Mehrab I of Kalat, 17th century Khan of the princely state of Kalat
 Mehrab Khan II of Kalat, 19th century Khan of the princely state of Kalat
 Al-Mehrab (1939–2003), senior Iraqi Shia cleric and  leader of the Supreme Council for Islamic Revolution in Iraq
 Mehrab Ghasemkhani, Iranian screenwriter and actor.
 Mehrab Fatemi, Persian strongman and three-time Asian Powerlifting champion.
 Mehrab Shahrokhi (1944–1993), was an Afro-Iranian footballer having played for Iranian national football team.

Places
 Mehrab, Kurdistan (محراب - Meḩrāb), a village in Kurdistan Province, Iran

Other uses
 Mehrab (rocket)

See also
 
 Mehrabad (disambiguation)